Arne Åkerson (born 23 August 1940 in Gävle, Sweden) is a Swedish former Olympic sailor. He competed in 1968 Summer Olympics, where he finished 7th in the Finn class. He also has a silver medal from the 1970 Star World Championships together with Ding Schoonmaker.

Åkerson represented Gefle Segelsällskap.

References

Olympic sailors of Sweden
Swedish male sailors (sport)
Finn class sailors
Star class sailors
Sailors at the 1968 Summer Olympics – Finn
1940 births
Living people
Finn class world champions
World champions in sailing for Sweden
Gefle Segelsällskap sailors
People from Gävle
Sportspeople from Gävleborg County
20th-century Swedish people